Grenada is an island country in the Caribbean.

Grenada may also refer to:

Places

United States
 Grenada, California, a town
 Grenada, Mississippi, a city
 Grenada County, Mississippi, a county

New Zealand
 Grenada, New Zealand, a suburb in Wellington
 Grenada North, a suburb in Wellington

Other uses
 Grenada (horse)

See also
 Granada (disambiguation)
 Grenade (disambiguation)
 Kingdom of Granada (disambiguation)